The 2014 Kerala Sahitya Akademi Award was announced on 29 February 2016.

Winners

Endowments
I. C. Chacko Award: A. M. Sreedharan (Beary Bhasha Nighantu, Linguistics/Grammar/Scientific study)
 C. B. Kumar Award: T. J. S. George (Ottayan, Essay)
K.R. Namboodiri Award: P. N. Das (Oruthulli Velicham, Medical literature)
Kanakasree Award: Sandhya N. P. (Swasikkunna Shabdham Mathram, Poetry)
Geetha Hiranyan Award: V. M. Devadas (Marana Sahayi, Stories)
G. N. Pillai Award: Manoj Mathirappally (Keralathile Adivasikal: Kalayum Samskaravum, Nonfiction)
Kuttippizha Award: P. P. Raveendran (Ethirezhuthukal: Bhavukathvathinte Bhoomisasthram, Criticism/Study)

Fellowship
 Prof. M. Thomas Mathew
 Kavalam Narayana Panicker

References

Kerala Sahitya Akademi Awards
Kerala Sahitya Akademi Awards